TI4 may refer to:
 The International 2014, a Dota 2 tournament
 Twilight Imperium: Fourth Edition, a 2017 board game